The 29th Robert Awards ceremony was held on 5 February 2012 in Copenhagen, Denmark. Organized by the Danish Film Academy, the awards honoured the best in Danish and foreign film of 2011.

Honorees

Best Danish Film 
 Melancholia

Best Children's Film 
 Rebounce – Heidi Maria Faisst

Best Director 
 Lars von Trier – Melancholia

Best Screenplay 
 Lars von Trier – Melancholia

Best Actor in a Leading Role 
 Nikolaj Lie Kaas – A Funny Man

Best Actress in a Leading Role 
 Kirsten Dunst – Melancholia

Best Actor in a Supporting Role 
 Lars Ranthe – A Funny Man

Best Actress in a Supporting Role 
 Charlotte Gainsbourg – Melancholia

Best Production Design 
 Jette Lehmann – Melancholia

Best Cinematography 
 Manuel Alberto Claro – Melancholia

Best Costume Design 
 Stine Gudmundsen-Holmgreen – A Funny Man

Best Makeup 
 Lis Kasper Bang – A Funny Man

Best Editing 
 Molly Malene Stensgaard – Melancholia

Best Sound Design 
 Kristian Eidnes Andersen – Melancholia

Best Score 
 Sune Martin – A Funny Man

Best Special Effects 
 Hummer Højmark & Peter Hjort – Melancholia

Best Song 
 "Lille frk. Himmelblå" – A Funny Man

Best Short Fiction/Animation 
 Girl in the Water – Jeppe Rønde & Woo Ming Jin

Best Long Fiction/Animation 
 Min bror Karim – Asger K. Kallesøe

Documentary Short 
 Den tid vi har – Mira Jargil

Best Documentary Feature 
 The Ambassador – Mads Brügger

Best American Film 
 Drive – Nicolas Winding Refn

Best Non-American Film 
 The King's Speech – Tom Hooper

Audience Award 
 All for One – as "Yousee Publikumsprisen"

See also 

 2012 Bodil Awards

References

External links 
  
 Robert-nomineringer @dfi.dk 

2011 film awards
Robert Awards ceremonies
2012 in Copenhagen
February 2012 events in Europe